Tom Brown (1915-1980), was an England international lawn bowls competitor.

Bowls career
He represented England at the 1966 World Outdoor Bowls Championship where he won a bronze medal in the team event (Leonard Trophy). He was a member of the triples and fours.

Brown joined Woking Park BC in 1947 and was ten times club champion and three time county champion.  In addition he was an indoor international.

Personal life
He was a postman by trade. He has a tournament named after him by his club.

References

1915 births
1980 deaths
English male bowls players